Ronald Douglas Correia (born September 13, 1967) is an American former professional baseball player who played parts of three seasons for the California Angels of Major League Baseball (MLB).

Amateur career
Correia played baseball, basketball and football at Dighton-Rehoboth Regional High School in North Dighton, Massachusetts. As a senior baseball player, he hit over .500. Correia played college baseball in NCAA Division III at the University of Massachusetts Dartmouth for three seasons. As a junior, he was named to the Division III All-American First Team. He tied a NCAA record with four home runs in a single game. In 1998, only two years after leaving the school, he was inducted into its athletics hall of fame.

Professional career
Correia was drafted by the Oakland Athletics in the 15th round of the 1988 Major League Baseball draft and assigned to the Southern Oregon A's to begin his professional career. He played in the Oakland farm system until January 1992 when he was traded to the California Angels for a fellow minor leaguer.

He was called up to the minors for the first time on June 20, 1993 when Angels infielder Damion Easley was placed on the disabled list. He made his Major League debut that afternoon against the Chicago White Sox as a defensive replacement at shortstop for Gary DiSarcina. Correia continued as a backup middle infielder for the Angels until DiSarcina suffered a season-ending injury in August. For the remainder of the season, Correia served as the starting shortstop.

In 1994, Correia was called up to the Majors for the first time on May 31 after Angels infielder Rex Hudler was placed on the disabled list. Correia appeared in only six Major League games that season.

On August 3, 1995, DiSarcina's thumb was broken by a pitch and he missed the remainder of the season. Correia filled in for the injured DiSarcina briefly before the team chose to play Easley at shortstop and demote Correia to Triple-A. His final Major League game came on September 16, 1995 at Anaheim Stadium.

He spent the following two seasons in the farm systems of the St. Louis Cardinals, Athletics and Boston Red Sox.

References

External links

1967 births
Living people
American expatriate baseball players in Canada
Baseball players from Providence, Rhode Island
California Angels players
Edmonton Trappers players
Huntsville Stars players
Louisville Redbirds players
Major League Baseball infielders
Midland Angels players
Modesto A's players
Pawtucket Red Sox players
Southern Oregon A's players
Tacoma Tigers players
Trenton Thunder players
Vancouver Canadians players